"Le temps" is a song by French-Cameroonian singer Tayc. It was released as the fifth single from him album Fleur froide.

Charts

Weekly charts

Year-end charts

Certifications

References

2021 singles
2021 songs
SNEP Top Singles number-one singles